Gainsborough Ward is a ward in the South East Area of Ipswich, Suffolk, England. It returns three councillors to Ipswich Borough Council.

It is designated Middle Layer Super Output Area Ipswich 016 by the Office of National Statistics. It is composed of 6 Lower Layer Super Output Areas.

The ward includes:
 Gainsborough
 Greenwich
 Landseer Park

Councillors
The following councillors were elected since the boundaries were changed in 2002. Names in brackets indicates that the councillor remained in office without re-election.

References

 
Wards of Ipswich
South East Area, Ipswich